Yahya Golmohammadi (born 19 March 1971) is an Iranian former footballer and coach who is currently managing the Persian Gulf Pro League club Persepolis. He is one of only eight Iranians to score in a World Cup and he is the oldest player to score on his first World Cup start, who did so for Iran in 2006 against Mexico.
His position was usually the central defender. He was a member of Iranian national football team and played most of his career in Persepolis. He previously managed some big clubs in Iran like Naft Tehran, Zob Ahan, Tractor Sazi and Padideh.

Early life
He was born on 19 March 1971 in Minabad, Ardabil Province, where he was recognized for his footballing talent as a youngster.

Playing career

Club
Yahya Golmohammadi played most of his professional career for Persepolis. He made his debut as a football player in 1989 with Tractor Sazi. Two years later, he signed with Poora. He played in Poora for four years and later signed with Persepolis in 1995 and began his work with Stanko Poklepović and won the league in his first season. In 1999, he moved to Ahvaz based club Foolad, but returned to Persepolis after only three seasons. In 2005, Yahya left Persepolis for a lucrative contract with Saba Battery, many critics were skeptical about his success in this newly formed team, but Saba Battery, with the help of Golmohammadi and Iranian national teammate Ali Daei, surprised everyone by winning the Hazfi Cup, and also did extremely well in the Asian Champions League, beating more experienced and seasoned campaigners. He played for Saba until 2008 when he announced his retirement as a football player.

International
Golmohammadi was a reliable defender with a cool approach to the game and slide tackles that became his hallmark. He has been immensely popular with Iranian fans after he scored the last minute winner in a 2002 World Cup qualifying game against Republic of Ireland, coming deep to head the ball home though Iran lost the game in aggregate and failed to qualify for the Korea/Japan World Cup. His emotions after the game were a dramatic scene that very few die-hard fans will forget.

On 11 June 2006, Golmohammadi scored the equaliser in a 3–1 loss to Mexico in the opening round of the 2006 FIFA World Cup. His tackle against Luís Figo in the next game against Portugal cost Iran a penalty. Golmohammadi was injured in the same game and was not available for Iran's final World Cup game versus Angola. He retired from international football immediately after World Cup 2006. He has 74 caps for the senior team and scored five times during his international duty.

He was also a member of Iran national under-23 football team in 2002 Asian Games which Iran won the football tournament under Branko Ivanković.

Coaching career

Saba
After the resignation of Mohammad Hossein Ziaei as the head coach of Saba Battery, Golmohammadi was named as his successor to lead the team for the ensuing fixtures. Golmohammadi led Saba in the remaining ten matches and led them to a third-place finish behind Persepolis and Sepahan which is the best result for Saba in Iran Pro League in the club's history. There were many rumors that Golmohammadi would continue to lead Saba for the following season but he refused to extend his contract. Firouz Karimi succeeded him as head coach of Saba in June 2008.

Tarbiat Yazd
In July 2008, Golmohammadi took over the Azadegan League side Tarbiat Yazd. His team started the 2008–09 season with three consecutive wins but at the end of the season, Tarbiat finished at 5th place of Group B and were not promoted to the Iran Pro League. He continued his work with Tarbiat Yazd the following season and led the team to a third-place finish but were shy one point of qualifying for a promotion play-off. At the end of the season, he resigned as head coach of Tarbiat Yazd in order to become head coach of another Azadegan league side, Nassaji Mazandaran.

Nassaji Mazandaran
He became head coach of his native town team, Nassaji Mazandaran in July 2010. He was also unable to promote Nassaji to the Iran Pro League as they finished at 4th place in the 2010–11 season. He was sacked by the club in September 2011.

Rah Ahan
After Ali Daei became head coach of Rah Ahan, he was chosen by his former teammate as first team coach. Yahya worked with Daei for one season as his assistant along with Željko Mijač but separated from the Rah Ahan coaching staff at the end of the season in order to take over the reins of Saba Qom for the second time.

Return to Saba
After Abdollah Veisi left the team for Paykan, Golmohammadi was named as head coach of Saba for a second time and returned to the club where he began his coaching career after four years. Golmohammadi signed a one-year contract with the club. His first match was a 4–0 win over Paykan which placed Saba at the top of the league. They stayed at the top the following week as well. They also defeated Persepolis 2–0 at the Azadi Stadium. The day after, Saba defeated Gahar Zagros 1–0. However, Golmohammadi was transferred to a hospital due to heart complications. He resigned on 24 September 2012 as head coach of Saba Qom due to health problems. His team was in 7th place before his departure.

Persepolis
On 25 September 2012, Persepolis officials announced that Golmohammadi would become the assistant coach of Manuel José instead of Mohsen Ashouri. He officially began his work on 26 September. On 7 December 2012, Golmohammadi was promoted to the first team as the caretaker manager after Jose was banned from training camp by club president Mohammad Rouyanian. Three days later, he was confirmed as the club's head coach and signed a contract with the club until the end of the season. He appointed Vinko Begović and Karim Bagheri as his new assistant managers at Persepolis.

His first game in charge of Persepolis came in a Hazfi Cup match against Malavan which his team won 6–0 with a hat-trick from Karim Ansarifard, two goals from Hadi Norouzi and a final goal from Gholamreza Rezaei. His side won their other three matches in Hazfi Cup to qualified to the final, when they lose in penalties to Sepahan. His first game for Persepolis in Iran Pro League was ended 2–2 against Sanat Naft with two early goals from Ali Karimi and Mohammad Nouri. With a 2–0 victory against Fajr Sepasi, Golmohammadi presiding over his first league win as manager of Persepolis. He then led Persepolis to an eleventh undefeated streak until a 1–0 loss to Rah Ahan on 10 March 2013. When he became head coach, Persepolis was in 12th place and he moved to sixth place in Iran Pro League table. Persepolis finished the season in the seventh place. He was offered by club officials a two years extension which was close to sign but after Hazfi Cup final, he refused to sign and his managerial rule at Persepolis was finished on 11 May 2013.

Naft Tehran
On 20 May 2013, Yahya signed a one-year contract with Naft Tehran, replacing Mansour Ebrahimzadeh. His side began the season with a 1–0 away win against Fajr Sepasi. Naft Tehran finished the 2013–14 Iran Pro League in 3rd place, qualified to the AFC Champions League play-offs that marked the club's best position in its history. Golmohammadi left Naft Tehran to Zob Ahan by mutual consent on 10 May 2014, after only one season in charge of the team.

Zob Ahan

On 10 May 2014, Zob Ahan announced on their official website that Yahya Golmohammadi signed a two-year deal with the Isfahani outfit. Despite a disappointing start, Zob Ahan began their successful run from the January 2015. They finished the league in the 4th place, securing AFC Champions League spot. They also won Hazfi Cup after defeating Naft Tehran in the final. The title was the first major trophy that Golmohammadi won since he started his managerial career. Zob Ahan also won the title in next year for the second season in row, by defeating Esteghlal in the final. He also managed to win the first addition of Iranian Super cup since its relaunch (the competition was abandoned in 2005 up until 2016).

On 24 September 2016, Golmohammadi parted away with Zob Ahan after a poor start of the season, which placed Zob Ahan in the 14th position.

Return to Persepolis 
On 13 January 2020, Golmohammadi was named Persepolis F.C. head coach, replacing Argentine Gabriel Calderón. This was Golmohammadi's second stint with Persepolis F.C.. At that moment he took charge of a team who were leading the Persian Gulf Pro League by 3 points. “This is a huge honor.” Golmohammadi said in his first talks as Persepolis new coach.

Career statistics

Club

International goals
Scores and results list Iran's goal tally first.

Managerial record

Honours

Player
Persepolis
Iranian Football League (3): 1995–96, 1996–97, 1998–99
Iranian Hazfi Cup (1): 1998–99

Saba
Iranian Super Cup (1): 2005

Iran U23
 Asian Games Gold Medal (1): 2002

Manager
Zob Ahan
Hazfi Cup (2): 2014–15, 2015–16
Iranian Super Cup (1): 2016

Persepolis
Persian Gulf Pro League (2): 2019–20, 2020–21
Iranian Super Cup (1): 2020
AFC Champions League runner-up: 2020

Individual
Iranian Manager of the Season (1): 2014–15
Navad Manager of the Month (1): August 2018

References

External links

1971 births
Living people
People from Namin, Ardabil
Iranian footballers
Iran international footballers
Association football central defenders
Persian Gulf Pro League players
Azadegan League players
Persepolis F.C. players
Foolad FC players
Saba players
2004 AFC Asian Cup players
2006 FIFA World Cup players
Tractor S.C. players
Asian Games gold medalists for Iran
Persepolis F.C. managers
Asian Games medalists in football
Footballers at the 2002 Asian Games
Medalists at the 2002 Asian Games
Saba Qom F.C. managers
Shahr Khodro F.C. managers
Iranian football managers
People from Mahmudabad, Mazandaran
F.C. Nassaji Mazandaran managers
Sportspeople from Mazandaran province
Persian Gulf Pro League managers